The Royal Military Academy ( or KMA) is the service academy for the Dutch Army, the Dutch Air Force and the Royal Marechaussee. Located in Breda, Southern Netherlands, the KMA has trained future officers since 1828.

Description
The KMA offers a programme of study which lasts four or five years, depending on the academic major cadets choose. Academic programmes have changed significantly during its history. In today's programme cadets are awarded a bachelor's degree upon graduation and commissioned in the Royal Netherlands Army, the Royal Netherlands Air Force or the Royal Marechaussee. The KMA also offers a shortened officers course of one and a half years. The training of the officers of the Royal Netherlands Navy and the Korps Mariniers is mainly done by the Royal Netherlands Naval College in Den Helder. The campus is about one kilometre square.

Alumni

Ranks

See also
 Koninklijke Militaire School
 Royal Naval College (Netherlands)

References

External links

 
 Ministerie van Defensie

Educational institutions established in 1828
Military academies
Military academies of the Netherlands
Education in North Brabant
Buildings and structures in Breda
1828 establishments in the Netherlands